The Saroléa Albatros was a 22 kW (30 hp) flat twin air-cooled aircraft engine, produced just before World War II in Belgium.

Design and development

In the 1930s, Saroléa were one of the biggest motorcycle producers in Europe, using their own engines.  They also designed and built small flat twin engines for light aircraft.  The Albatros dates from about 1938.

It had chrome-nickel steel machined piston barrels, with closely spaced  cooling fins. The cylinder heads were aluminium alloy, with hemispherical combustion chambers and bronze valve seats.  The connecting rods had big and little ends with roller bearings.  The crankshaft was a chrome nickel steel forging, running in a combination of roller and ball bearings; a ball bearing at the output side crankshaft end allowed the Albatros to be used in either pusher or tractor configuration.

With a maximum power of only  at 2,650 rpm, the Abatros was targeted at the small single seat sports aircraft of the day.

Applications

These types were also fitted, or planned to be fitted with other small engines.
 Kocjan Bąk II
 Ścibor-Rylski ŚR-3
 Tipsy S.2

Engines on display
 A Saroléa Albatros is on display at Old Warden in the Shuttleworth Collection.

Specifications

References

Flat engines
1930s aircraft piston engines
Air-cooled aircraft piston engines